İdrisoba is a village and municipality in the Khachmaz Rayon of Azerbaijan.  It has a population of 716.  The municipality consists of the villages of İdrisoba and Fərzəlioba.

References 

Populated places in Khachmaz District